Karel Poborský (born 30 March 1972) is a Czech former professional footballer who played as a right winger. He was most noted for his technical ability and pace.

He began and finished his club career at Dynamo České Budějovice, where his kit number (8) is retired in his honour. He also won the Czech First League titles at the two largest clubs in Prague - Slavia and Sparta. Between these domestic triumphs, he won a Premier League title at Manchester United and also played for Benfica and Lazio.

After Petr Čech, Poborský ranks second in appearances for the Czech national team, with 118 between 1994 and 2006, retiring from international football after playing at the country's first World Cup. He also played in three European Championships, being named in the Team of the Tournament at UEFA Euro 1996 after helping the Czechs to the final.

Club career
Poborský began playing professionally with České Budějovice, FK Viktoria Žižkov and SK Slavia Prague (the season Patrik Berger left for Borussia Dortmund).

Poborský was one of a number of the Czech squad at UEFA Euro 1996 who left the Czech Republic to play in another country after the tournament. In July 1996 he signed with Manchester United but, due to David Beckham's rising stardom, Poborský would only manage one-and-a-half seasons at Old Trafford. He did collect a Premier League title winner's medal in the 1996–97 season, however, playing in 22 out of 38 league games and scoring four goals, also helping United reach the Champions League semi-finals.

In January 1998, he left for Primeira Divisão side Benfica, where he was at his best form, playing alongside João Pinto, and became an instant hit and a fan favourite.

After a string of impressive performances, Poborský moved sides in January 2001, joining Serie A's Lazio. Whilst at Lazio he played a key role in the destination of the 2001–02 Serie A title. On the final day of the season Inter Milan were playing at Lazio knowing a win would give them the title. However Lazio won 4–2, with Poborský scoring twice, and the title went to Juventus instead. In July 2002, he returned to his homeland, signing with Sparta Prague, where he became the highest-paid footballer playing in the Czech Republic. He subsequently returned to his first club, Dynamo České Budějovice, scoring two goals and setting up a third on the way to a 4–0 victory against Sigma Olomouc B in his first match. He retired on 28 May 2007 after a match against another former side, Slavia Prague.

International career
Poborský's first international appearance, against Turkey on 23 February 1994, was also the first match for the Czech team after the partition of Czechoslovakia. He played for his country at Euro 96, where he was one of the most valuable players of the entire tournament, Euro 2000, and Euro 2004, and was also in the nation's squad for the 2006 World Cup. After the 2006 World Cup, Poborský retired from international competition.

Following his 2007 club retirement, Poborský started working as a technical leader for the national team.

Poborský lob
Poborský's name is often attached to his performance in Euro 96, where during the quarter-final match against Portugal, he chipped the ball and lobbed it over the advancing Vítor Baía. The goal became a trademark shot for Poborský, as that shooting style was soon attributed to him.

In 2008, it was voted the best individual goal in the Carlsberg goal of the day poll on Euro2008.com. As a club player, Poborský scored a similar goal against Porto (again with Vítor Baía as the goalkeeper) while at Benfica.

Personal life
In 2016, Poborský was put into a medically-induced coma after contracting a brain infection that left the muscles in his face paralysed and with a hypersensitivity to light. He spent three weeks quarantined in hospital before making a full recovery, but he said if he had arrived at the hospital a day later, he might have died.

Career statistics

Club

Notes

International

Scores and results list Czech Republic's goal tally first, score column indicates score after each Poborský goal.

Honours

Slavia Prague
Czech First League: 1995–96

Manchester United
FA Premier League: 1996–97
FA Charity Shield: 1996, 1997

Sparta Prague
Czech First League: 2002–03, 2004–05
Czech Cup: 2003–04

Czech Republic
UEFA European Championship runner-up: 1996
FIFA Confederations Cup third place: 1997

Individual
Czech Footballer of the Year: 1996 (shared with Patrik Berger)
Czech First League Best eleven of the season: 1995–96, 2002–03, 2003–04, 2004–05
UEFA Team of the Tournament: UEFA Euro 1996
Top assist provider: UEFA Euro 1996 (3 assists, shared with Youri Djorkaeff), UEFA Euro 2004 (4 assists)
Czech Footballer of the Year personality of the Czech First League: 2003, 2004, 2005

See also
List of men's footballers with 100 or more international caps

References

External links

 
 
 

1972 births
Living people
People from Třeboň
Sportspeople from the South Bohemian Region
Czech footballers
Association football midfielders
FIFA Century Club
Czech First League players
Premier League players
Primeira Liga players
Serie A players
FK Viktoria Žižkov players
SK Slavia Prague players
SK Dynamo České Budějovice players
AC Sparta Prague players
Manchester United F.C. players
S.L. Benfica footballers
S.S. Lazio players
Czech Republic international footballers
UEFA Euro 1996 players
1997 FIFA Confederations Cup players
UEFA Euro 2000 players
UEFA Euro 2004 players
2006 FIFA World Cup players
Czech expatriate footballers
Czech expatriate sportspeople in Italy
Expatriate footballers in Italy
Czech expatriate sportspeople in England
Expatriate footballers in England
Czech expatriate sportspeople in Portugal
Expatriate footballers in Portugal